The Godfather Part III is a 1990 American crime film produced and directed by Francis Ford Coppola from the screenplay co-written with Mario Puzo. The film stars Al Pacino, Diane Keaton, Talia Shire, Andy García, Eli Wallach, Joe Mantegna, Bridget Fonda, George Hamilton, and Sofia Coppola. It is the third and final installment in The Godfather trilogy. A sequel to The Godfather (1972) and The Godfather Part II (1974), it concludes the fictional story of Michael Corleone, the patriarch of the Corleone family who attempts to legitimize his criminal empire. The film also includes fictionalized accounts of two real-life events: the 1978 death of Pope John Paul I and the Papal banking scandal of 1981–1982, both linked to Michael Corleone's business affairs.

Coppola and Puzo's intended title for the film was The Death of Michael Corleone, which Paramount Pictures rejected; Coppola considers the series to be a duology, while Part III serves as the epilogue. The Godfather Part III received generally positive reviews, albeit not to the same extent as the earlier two films; critics praised Pacino's performance and the screenplay but criticized the plot and Sofia Coppola's performance.

The film was distributed by Paramount, which also distributed the previous two films. It premiered in Beverly Hills on December 20, 1990, and released in the United States on Christmas Day, December 25. It grossed $136.8 million and was nominated for seven Academy Awards, including Best Picture. In December 2020, a recut version of the film, titled The Godfather Coda: The Death of Michael Corleone, was released to coincide with the 30th anniversary of the original version.

Plot
In 1979, Michael Corleone is approaching 60. Wracked with guilt over his ruthless rise to power, especially for having ordered his brother Fredo Corleone's murder, he donates millions to charitable causes. Michael and Kay are divorced; their children, Anthony and Mary, live with Kay. At the reception in Michael's honor at St. Patrick's Old Cathedral, which follows a papal order induction ceremony, Anthony tells his father that he is leaving law school to become an opera singer. Kay supports his decision, but Michael wants Anthony to complete his law degree first but after being convinced, Michael agrees to let Anthony go his own way. Michael and Kay have an uneasy reunion when Kay reveals that she and Anthony know the truth about Fredo's death. Vincent Mancini, the out-of-wedlock son of Michael's long-dead brother Sonny Corleone, arrives at the reception. Michael's sister, Connie Corleone, arranges for Vincent to settle a dispute with his rival, Joey Zasa, but Zasa calls Vincent a bastard, and Vincent bites Zasa's ear. Michael, troubled by Vincent's fiery temper yet impressed by his loyalty, agrees to include Vincent in the family business.

Michael knows that the head of the Vatican Bank, Archbishop Gilday, has accumulated a massive deficit and offers $600M in exchange for shares in Internazionale Immobiliare, an international real estate company, which would make him its largest single shareholder. He makes a tender offer to buy the Vatican's 25% share in the company, which will give him controlling interest. Immobiliare's board approves the offer, pending ratification by the Pope.

Don Altobello, a New York Mafia boss and Connie's godfather, tells Michael that his partners on The Commission want in on the Immobiliare deal. Michael pays them from the sale of his Las Vegas holdings. Zasa receives nothing and, declaring Michael his enemy, storms out. Don Altobello, assuring Michael that he can diplomatically resolve the matter, leaves to speak to Zasa. Moments later, a helicopter hovers outside the conference room and opens fire. Most of the bosses are killed, but Michael, Vincent, and Michael's bodyguard, Al Neri, escape. Michael realizes that Altobello is the traitor, and suffers a diabetic stroke. As Michael recuperates, Vincent and Mary begin a romance, while Neri and Connie give Vincent permission to retaliate against Zasa. During a street festival, Vincent kills Zasa. Michael berates Vincent for his actions and insists that Vincent end his relationship with Mary because they are first cousins and because Vincent is in organized crime.

The family goes to Sicily for Anthony's operatic debut in Palermo at the Teatro Massimo. Michael tells Vincent to pretend to defect from the Corleone family in order to spy on Altobello. Altobello introduces Vincent to Licio Lucchesi, Immobiliare's chairman. Michael visits Cardinal Lamberto, anticipated being the next pope, to discuss the deal. Lamberto persuades Michael to make his first confession in 30 years, during which Michael tearfully confesses that he ordered Fredo's murder. Lamberto says that Michael deserves to suffer for his sins, but can be redeemed. He gives him sacramental absolution, permanently forgiving all his past sins in the eyes of God. Michael discovers that the Immobiliare deal is an elaborate swindle, arranged by Lucchesi, Gilday, and Vatican accountant Frederick Keinszig.

Vincent tells Michael that Altobello has hired Mosca, a veteran hitman, to assassinate Michael. Mosca and his son, disguised as priests, kill Corleone family friend Don Tommasino as he returns to his villa. While Michael and Kay tour Sicily, Michael asks for Kay's forgiveness, and they admit they still love each other. At Tommasino's funeral, Michael vows to sin no more. Following the pope's death, Cardinal Lamberto is elected to succeed him, and humbly accepts, choosing as his name Pope John Paul I. Subsequently, the Immobiliare deal is ratified. The plotters against the ratification attempt to cover their tracks and Gilday kills the new pope with poisoned tea. Michael sees that Vincent is a changed man and names him the new Don of the Corleone family, in return for ending his romance with his cousin Mary.

The family sees Anthony's performance in Cavalleria rusticana in Palermo while Vincent exacts his revenge:
 Vincent's men smother Keinszig and then hang him from a bridge, making his death look like a suicide;
 At the opera, Connie gives Altobello a poisoned cannoli and watches him die from her opera box;
 Calò, Tommasino's former bodyguard, stabs Lucchesi in the neck with his own spectacles.
 Neri travels to the Vatican, where he shoots and kills Gilday.

At the opera house during Anthony's performance, three of Vincent's men search for Mosca, but he overcomes them. After the show, on the opera house steps as they leave, Mosca shoots at Michael, wounding him; a second bullet hits Mary, killing her as Mosca's son flees. Vincent shoots and kills Mosca. Michael cradles Mary's body and screams in agony; the scene fades out into a montage of Michael dancing with Mary; his first wife, Apollonia; and finally, Kay. 

Years later, an elderly Michael, sitting alone in the courtyard of Don Tommasino's villa, slumps over and falls to the ground.

Cast

Production

Coppola felt that the first two films had told the complete Corleone saga. He intended Part III to be an epilogue to the first two films. A dire financial situation initially caused by the failure of One from the Heart (1982) compelled him to take up Paramount's offer to make a third installment. Coppola and Puzo preferred the title The Death of Michael Corleone, but Paramount Pictures found that unacceptable.

Al Pacino, Diane Keaton, and Talia Shire reprised their roles from the first two films. According to Coppola's audio commentary on the film in The Godfather DVD Collection, Robert Duvall refused to take part unless he was paid a salary comparable to Pacino's. In 2004, on the CBS program 60 Minutes, Duvall said, "if they paid Pacino twice what they paid me, that's fine, but not three or four times, which is what they did." When Duvall dropped out, Coppola rewrote the screenplay to portray Tom Hagen as having died before the story begins and created the character B. J. Harrison, played by George Hamilton, to replace the Hagen character in the story. Coppola stated that, to him, the movie feels incomplete "without [Robert] Duvall's participation". According to Coppola, had Duvall agreed to take part in the film, the Hagen character would have been heavily involved in running the Corleone charities. Duvall confirmed in a 2010 interview that he never regretted the decision of turning down his role.

The first draft of a script had been written by Dean Riesner in 1979, based on a story by Mario Puzo. This script centered around Michael Corleone's son, Anthony, a naval officer working for the CIA, and the Corleone family's involvement with a plot to assassinate a Central American dictator. Almost none of the elements of this early script carried over to the final film, but one scene from the filmin which two men break into Vincent's houseexists in the Riesner draft and is nearly unchanged.

Julia Roberts was originally cast as Mary but dropped out due to scheduling conflicts. Madonna wanted to play the role, but Coppola felt she was too old for the part. Rebecca Schaeffer was set to audition, but was murdered by an obsessed fan. Winona Ryder dropped out of the film at the last minute due to nervous exhaustion. Ultimately, Sofia Coppola, the director's daughter, was given the role of Michael Corleone's daughter. Her much-criticized performance resulted in her father being accused of nepotism, a charge Coppola denies in the commentary track, asserting that, in his opinion, critics, "beginning with an article in Vanity Fair," were "using [my] daughter to attack me," something he finds ironic in light of the film's denouement when Mary pays the ultimate price for her father's sins.

As an infant, Sofia Coppola had played Michael Corleone's infant nephew in The Godfather, during the climactic baptism/murder montage at the end of that film (Sofia Coppola also appeared in The Godfather Part II, as a small immigrant child in the scene where the nine-year-old Vito Corleone arrives by steamer at Ellis Island). The character of Michael's sister Connie is played by Francis Ford Coppola's sister, Talia Shire. Other Coppola relatives with cameos in the film included the director's mother, father (who wrote and conducted much of the music in the film), uncle, and granddaughter Gia.

Principal photography was set to begin on November 15, 1989, but the start date was pushed back to November 27. Filming continued throughout much of 1990.

Music

The film's soundtrack received a Golden Globe Award nomination for Best Score. The film's love theme, "Promise Me You'll Remember" (subtitled "Love Theme from The Godfather Part III") sung by Harry Connick, Jr., received Academy Award and Golden Globe Award nominations for Best Song.

Al Martino, who portrayed Johnny Fontane in The Godfather and The Godfather Part III, sings "To Each His Own".

Release
The film was distributed by Paramount Pictures, premiering in Beverly Hills on December 20, 1990 and released in the United States on December 25.

Alternate versions

The Godfather Part III: Final Director's Cut (1991)
For the film's 1991 home video release, Coppola re-edited it, adding 9 minutes of deleted footage, for a running time of 170 minutes. This cut was initially released on VHS & Laserdisc and was advertised as the "Final Director's Cut". It was the only version of the film available on home video until 2020. The original theatrical cut was released on home video in 2022, exclusively as a part of The Godfather Trilogy 4K Boxset.

The Godfather Coda: The Death of Michael Corleone (2020)
For the film's 30th anniversary, a recut version of the film titled The Godfather Coda: The Death of Michael Corleone had a limited theatrical release on December 4, 2020, followed by digital and Blu-ray releases on December 8. Coppola's 2020 cut includes changes to both the beginning and the ending of the film and some re-edited scenes and musical cues. The total run-time of this version is 158 minutes.

Coppola said the 2020 recut version is the one he and Puzo originally envisioned, and that it "vindicates" its status in The Godfather trilogy, as well as his daughter Sofia's performance. Both Pacino and Keaton gave their approval to the recut film, noting it as an improvement over the original film.

Reception and legacy

Box office
The Godfather Part III grossed $66.7 million in the United States and Canada, and $70.1 million in other territories, for a worldwide total of $136.8 million, against a production budget of $54 million.

The film opened in 1,901 theaters, and grossed $19.6 million in its opening weekend, finishing second behind Home Alone. It would go on to generate a total of $6 million on Christmas Day, which was the highest at the time. For seven years, the film held that record until 1997 when it was surpassed by Titanic. In its second weekend it made $8.3 million, finishing third.

Upon the release of the recut version, The Godfather Coda: The Death of Michael Corleone, in December 2020, it made $52,000 from 179 theaters. In total, the film made $95,000 domestically, and $71,000 in four international markets.

Critical response

Original film (1990)

Common criticisms of The Godfather Part III focused on Sofia Coppola's acting, the convoluted plot, and the film's inadequacy as a "stand-alone" story. On Rotten Tomatoes, the film holds an approval rating of 67% based on 67 reviews, with an average rating of 6.40/10. The site's critical consensus reads: "The final installment of The Godfather saga recalls its predecessors' power when it's strictly business, but underwhelming performances and confused tonality brings less closure to the Corleone story." Metacritic assigned the film a weighted average score of 60 out of 100, based on 19 critics, which indicates "mixed or average reviews". Opening day audiences polled by CinemaScore gave the film an average grade of "B+" on an A+ to F scale.

In his review, Roger Ebert stated that it is "not even possible to understand this film without knowing the first two". Nonetheless, Ebert wrote an enthusiastic review, awarding the film three-and-a-half, a better rating than he originally gave The Godfather Part II (in his 2008 re-rating, he gave The Godfather Part II four stars and included it in his list of Great Movies). He also defended the casting of Sofia Coppola, who he felt was not miscast, stating, "There is no way to predict what kind of performance Francis Ford Coppola might have obtained from Winona Ryder, the experienced and talented young actress, who was originally set to play this role. But I think Sofia Coppola brings a quality of her own to Mary Corleone. A certain up-front vulnerability and simplicity that I think are appropriate and right for the role."

Ebert's colleague, Gene Siskel, also gave the film high praise and placed it tenth in his list of the ten best films of 1990. Siskel admitted that the ending was the film's weakest part, citing Al Pacino's makeup as very poor. He also said, "[Another] problem is the casting of Sofia Coppola, who is out of her acting league here. She's supposed to be Andy Garcia's love interest but no sparks fly. He's more like her babysitter." In response to Ebert's defense of Coppola, Siskel said: "I know what you're saying about her being sort of natural and not the polished bombshell, and that would've been wrong. There is one, a photographer in the picture, who takes care of that role, but at the same time, I don't think it's explained why [Vincent] really comes onto her, unless this guy is the most venal, craven guy, but look who he's playing around with. He's playing around with the Godfather's daughter."

Leonard Maltin, giving the film three out of four, stated that it is "masterfully told", but that casting Sofia Coppola was an "almost-fatal flaw". James Berardinelli gave the film a positive review, awarding it three-and-a-half. John Simon of the National Review described the film as "a tedious effort to flog an old hippopotamus into action".

Recut version (2020)
On Rotten Tomatoes, the recut version, The Godfather Coda: The Death of Michael Corleone, holds an approval rating of 86% based on 58 reviews, with an average rating of 7.50/10. The website's critics consensus reads: "The Godfather, Coda: The Death of Michael Corleone pulls the audience back into Francis Ford Coppola's epic gangster saga with a freshly — albeit slightly — edited version of its final installment." On Metacritic, the film was assigned a weighted average score of 76 out of 100, based on 14 reviews, indicating "generally favorable reviews".

Writing for The Guardian, Peter Bradshaw gave the film three out of five stars and stated, "I'm not sure how much, if anything, Coppola's re-edit does for the film, but it's worth a watch." Owen Gleiberman of Variety stated, "Here's the news and the ever-so-slight scandal: It's the same damn movie. I'm not exaggerating; it really is. The one impactful change is the new opening scene." Writing for IndieWire, David Ehrlich said, "But when it was announced that [Coppola] had inevitably assembled a new cut of his most famous cause célèbre and re-christened it with the title he'd always wanted for the film... he wasn't trying to make it 'better' so much as he was trying to shift its place in history and reframe the picture as less the third part of a flawed trilogy than the postscript of a legendary dyad."

Accolades

Although reception to the film was mixed, the film was nominated for seven Academy Awards including Best Picture, Best Director, Best Actor in a Supporting Role (Andy García), Best Cinematography, Best Film Editing, Best Art Direction-Set Decoration (Dean Tavoularis, Gary Fettis), Best Music, Song (for Carmine Coppola and John Bettis for "Promise Me You'll Remember"). It is the only film in the series not to have Al Pacino nominated for an Academy Award (he was nominated for Best Supporting Actor for The Godfather and for Best Actor for The Godfather Part II). It is the only film in the trilogy not to win for Best Picture or any other Academy Award for that matter, as well as the only film in the trilogy not selected for preservation by the U.S. National Film Registry as of 2022. Along with The Lord of the Rings, The Godfather Trilogy shares the distinction that all of its installments were nominated for Best Picture.

The film was also nominated for seven Golden Globe Awards, but did not win. Sofia Coppola won two Golden Raspberry Awards for both Worst Supporting Actress and Worst New Star.

The film is recognized by American Film Institute in these lists:
 2005: AFI's 100 Years...100 Movie Quotes:
 Michael Corleone: "Just when I thought I was out, they pull me back in." – Nominated

Historical background

Parts of the film are very loosely based on real historical events concerning the ending of the papacy of Pope Paul VI, the very short tenure of Pope John Paul I in 1978, and the collapse of the Banco Ambrosiano in 1982. Like the character Cardinal Lamberto, who becomes John Paul I, the historical John Paul I, Albino Luciani, reigned for only a very short time before being found dead in his bed.

Journalist David Yallop argues that Luciani was planning a reform of Vatican finances and that he died by poisoning; these claims are reflected in the film. Yallop also names as a suspect Archbishop Paul Marcinkus, who was the head of the Vatican bank, like the character Archbishop Gilday in the film. However, while Marcinkus was noted for his muscular physique and Chicago origins, Gilday is a mild Irishman. The character has also drawn comparisons to Cardinal Giuseppe Caprio, as he was in charge of the Vatican finances during the approximate period in which the movie was based.

The character of Frederick Keinszig, the Swiss banker who is murdered and left hanging under a bridge, mirrors the fate (and physical appearance) of Roberto Calvi, the Italian head of the Banco Ambrosiano who was found hanging under Blackfriars Bridge in London in 1982 (though it was initially unclear whether it was suicide or murder, in 2002 courts in London ruled the latter). The name "Keinszig" is taken from Manuela Kleinszig, the girlfriend of Flavio Carbone, who was indicted as one of Calvi's murderers in 2005.

Cancelled sequel
Following the reaction to the third installment, Coppola stated that the idea of a fourth film was discussed but Mario Puzo died before they were able to write it. A potential script, told in a similar narrative to Part II, would have included De Niro reprising his role as a younger Vito Corleone in the 1930s; Leonardo DiCaprio was slated to portray a young Sonny Corleone gaining the Corleone family's political power; García as Vincent Corleone during the 1980s running the family business through ten years of destructive war, haunted by the death of his cousin Mary, and eventually losing the family's respect and power. García has since claimed the film's script was nearly produced.

Puzo's portion of the potential sequel, dealing with the Corleone family in the early 1930s, was eventually expanded into a novel by Edward Falco and published in 2012 as The Family Corleone. Paramount sued the Puzo estate to prevent publication of the novel, prompting a counter-suit on the part of the estate, claiming breach of contract. The studio and the estate subsequently settled the suits, allowing publication of the book, but with the studio retaining rights to possible future films.

References

Sources

  Included in The Godfather DVD Collection.

External links

 
 
 
 
 

1990 crime drama films
1990 films
Sicilian-language films
American crime drama films
American sequel films
American Zoetrope films
Cultural depictions of the Mafia
Cultural depictions of Pope John Paul I
Films about father–daughter relationships
Films about father–son relationships
Films set in the 1970s
Films set in the 1980s
Films set in Italy
Films set in New Jersey
Films set in New York City
Films set in Sicily
Films set in Vatican City
Films shot in Atlantic City, New Jersey
Films shot in New York City
Films shot in Rome
Films about atonement
Films about cousins
Films about the American Mafia
Films about the Sicilian Mafia
Films based on American novels
Films based on organized crime novels
Films directed by Francis Ford Coppola
Films produced by Francis Ford Coppola
Films scored by Carmine Coppola
Films scored by Nino Rota
Films with screenplays by Francis Ford Coppola
Films with screenplays by Mario Puzo
The Godfather films
Paramount Pictures films
Golden Raspberry Award winning films
1990s English-language films
1990s American films